Gilson Silva Goes (born 20 March 2000), better known as Gilsinho, is a Brazilian footballer who plays as a winger.

Career
He's been on Palmeiras since July 2009. He played in the Copa Belo Horizonte de Juniores in 2009 and 2010, has won the under-20 Campeonato Paulista in 2009, participated in the Copa São Paulo de Futebol Junior in 2010 and played the Paulista Série A-3 in 2010 for Palmeiras B, helping the team to rise to the Série A-2.

External links
Profile at Palmeiras website
Profile  at Ogol website

1991 births
Brazilian footballers
Sociedade Esportiva Palmeiras players
Living people
Association football forwards
Sportspeople from Paraná (state)
São Carlos Futebol Clube players
Operário Ferroviário Esporte Clube players
J. Malucelli Futebol players
Clube Atlético Penapolense players
Sport Club Atibaia players